An election was held on November 7, 1933 to elect the President of the New York City Board of Aldermen, along with other contests such as the mayoralty, Comptroller, and aldermen. Democratic incumbent Joseph V. McKee had resigned earlier in the year to assume the office of Mayor after Jimmy Walker had resigned that position, and the aldermanic presidential post was occupied by Dennis J. Mahon in the meantime. Republican candidate Bernard S. Deutsch defeated Democratic candidate Milton Solomon and Recovery Party candidate Natan Straus Jr. to win the position.

References

Aldermanic presidential election
New York City aldermanic presidential election
New York City aldermanic presidential election
New York City aldermanic presidential election